Filipstad Municipality (Filipstads kommun) is a municipality in Värmland County in west central Sweden. Its seat is located in the city of Filipstad.

The present municipality was created in 1971 when the City of Filipstad was merged with the rural municipalities of Kroppa, Rämmen and Värmlandsberg.

Localities
With at least 200 inhabitants:
Filipstad, 6,300 inhabitants (seat)
Lesjöfors, 1,247 inhabitants
Nykroppa, 1,020 inhabitants
Persberg, 350 inhabitants
Nordmark, 250 inhabitants

Demographics

2022
This is a demographic table based on Filipstad Municipality's electoral districts in the 2022 Swedish general election sourced from SVT's election platform, in turn taken from SCB official statistics.

Residents include everyone registered as living in the district, regardless of age or citizenship status. Valid voters indicate Swedish citizens above the age of 18 who therefore can vote in general elections. Left vote and right vote indicate the result between the two major blocs in said district in the 2022 general election. Employment indicates the share of people between the ages of 20 and 64 who are working taxpayers. Foreign background denotes residents either born abroad or with two parents born outside of Sweden. Median income is the received monthly income through either employment, capital gains or social grants for the median adult above 20, also including pensioners in Swedish kronor. College graduates indicates any degree accumulated after high school.

In total there were 10,387 residents with 7,763 Swedish citizen adults eligible to vote. The political demographics were 46.5 % for the left bloc and 52.3 % for the right bloc. Filipstad is generally a low-income municipality, with low attainment of college degrees and about 22 % were of foreign background.

References

External links
 
Filipstad Municipality - Official site
filipstad.ifolkmun.se - Local news site

Municipalities of Värmland County